Audu Maikori (born 13 August 1975 in Kaduna) is a Nigerian lawyer, entrepreneur, social activist, public speaker and creative industry expert. He is the co-founder and Executive Vice Chairman of the Chocolate City Group the mother company of leading African record label Chocolate City Entertainment. He is well known as Founder of Chocolate City, Entertainment lawyer and regarded as the "Simon Cowell" in Nigerian Idol's first season. He won multiple awards during his career, including the International Young Music Entrepreneur of the Year award in 2007.

Early life and education
Audu Maikori was born in Kaduna State but hails from Kwoi, in Jaba local government home to the infamous  Nok Culture to Adamu Maikori a renowned lawyer and politician and Laiatu Maikori (née Gyet Maude - the Ham Royal family).  He was raised in Lagos and attended Adrao International School and King's College before obtaining his law degree from the University of Jos in 1999. He later obtained his Bachelor of Laws (B.L) from the Law school Abuja.

Career

Early entertainment career
In 1997, Audu and his friends at the University of Jos started discussing the possibilities of setting up a club. After a debate on the name of club, Audu suggested naming the club Chocolate City. Chocolate City became the biggest rave around the Universities in northern Nigeria.

The Guild of Artistes and Poets (GAP)
During his National Youth Service Corps (NYSC) program Audu and his friend named Paul Okeugo founded the Guild of Artistes and Poets (GAP), a non-profit arts society. The GAP held its first meeting in April 2001. The GAP formed strategic alliances with the Ministry of Culture and Tourism, the British Council and held art exhibitions in partnership with the French Cultural Centre. The GAP expanded its reach to Jos, Plateau State and in Lagos. By 2005 the GAP had over 300 active members.

Legal career
Audu was called to the Nigerian Bar Association in January 2001 and started his legal career working as an Associate with the litigation-inclined firm of Chief Afe Babalola SAN & Co where he worked from 2001 to 2003. He worked as legal advisor to leasing company of Nigeria (a subsidiary of Bank of Industry), and company secretary of Abuja Markets Management Limited.

In 2006, Maikori was appointed Senior Legal consultant with CPCS Transcom International, where he worked on the legal and regulatory aspects of privatization transactions including the Nigeria Ports Authority, Nigerian Railway Corporation, unbundling and privatization of PHCN. He represented Nigeria in the UNIDROIT Sub-Committee of governmental experts for the preparation of a preliminary draft Protocol to the Convention on International Interests in Mobile Equipment on Matters specific to Space Assets in 2005.

In May 2007, Maikori co-organized the first Nigerian International Music Summit in March 2007. Over 400 music industry stakeholders drawn from all over Nigeria attended the event. Maikori is a member of the Chartered Institute of Arbitrators UK, International Association of Entertainment Lawyers, the Nigerian Bar Association and International Bar Association (IBA).

In 2002, he along with his brother Yahaya Maikori started Law Allianz, a firm of legal practitioners based in Lagos and Abuja. He was selected as lead legal consultant for key national infrastructure projects including the Lagos Rail Mass Transit project (2008), Abuja Mass Transit project (2006-2008) and Kano Mass transit project in 2011. In March 2015, Audu resigned from 'Law Allianz' to concentrate on other business affairs.

Chocolate City
Chocolate City Limited was registered in October 2003 but commenced business in 2005. Audu partnering with Paul Okeugo and his brother Yahaya Maikori as directors of the company. Later that year he alongside Paul Okeugo and two other partners produced first event under 'Chocolate City' banner in partnership with British American Tobacco, which held at the University of Maiduguri. Audu was introduced to a song called Na Ba Ka by an artist named Jeremiah Gyang's by Six Foot Plus. In January 2005, Chocolate City signed Jeremiah Gyang under a recording and management contract and re-released the album 'Na Ba Ka'. In mid 2006, M.I was signed up to Chocolate City.

In 2012, after a corporate restructure, Chocolate City Group was formed with renowned businessman and lawyer Hakeem Bello-Osagie joining the board as Chairman. Four companies were formed to constitute the group namely Chocolate City Music, Chocolate City Media, Chocolate City Distribution and STM with Audu appointed as President of the Group. In
March 2015, Audu announced the return of Jesse Jagz to Chocolate City. On 30 June 2015 Audu via Twitter announced his exit as CEO of Chocolate City Music and the appointment of M.I as the new CEO of Chocolate City Music, with label mate Ice Prince Zamani as the Vice President of the music label. Audu also announced the objectives for the 3 Chocolate City subsidiaries to include radio, television and film.

On 30 June 2015, Audu resigned as CEO of Chocolate City Music handing the reigns to former vice president of the label, M.I. Ice Prince was made the new vice president of Chocolate City.

In March 2018, Chocolate City launched CCX Lounge- a live music venue and lounge located at the prestigious Jabi Lake Mall, in Abuja. The 400 capacity venue is purpose-built for live music and its decor has been hailed as authentic Afro Nigerian by Mode Men Magazine.

Activism
Maikori has received commendations for his work in developing the youth including being invited to Albania in 2008 to deliver a keynote speech at a seminar organized by the Albania Ministry of Youth and Employment, Minister of culture and British Council.

In 2010, Maikori was part of the Enough is Enough campaign which saw thousands of Nigerians protest against issues. In a four-hour protest, they marched to the National Assembly in Abuja. Maikori became the face of Enough is Enough after a police officer warned him to back down or be shot; Maikori refused to back down. He later led the other protesters to march on peacefully to make their protests heard by the National Assembly.

Southern Kaduna killings

Maikori was very vocal against the Southern Kaduna killings by suspected Fulani herdsmen who killed over 250 men and women of Southern Kaduna origin. He was vocal about the seeming neglect by the Kaduna State Governor and The Federal Government of Nigeria, especially when the Kaduna State Governor Mallam El Rufai admitted to paying Fulani herdsmen compensation to "stop" them from killing the predominantly Christian Southern Kaduna population. In March 2017, he was arrested and arraigned by the Kaduna State (his state of origin) Governor over alleged incitement to violence. On 28th day of October, 2017, the Nigerian media was awash with headlines announcing the victory of Maikori in which forty million (N40,000,000) Naira was awarded to Maikori as damages against the Governor of Kaduna State, Mal. Nasir El-Rufai and the Nigerian Police Force. Maikori had brought a case of unlawful arrest and abuse of his fundamental human rights when Gov. El-Rufai caused his arrest and detention on 17 February 2017

National service

On 13 February 2012, Audu Maikori was appointed to represent Nigerian Youth as a member of the Presidential Committee on the Subsidy Reinvestment and Empowerment Programme (SURE-P), the committee was formed by President Goodluck Jonathan himself. Maikori was the youngest member of the committee. He was placed in charge of the Graduate Internship Scheme which under his coordination grew the number of employed interns from 1,800 interns in 2013 to 22,000 interns by January 2015.

In May 2012 Maikori was elected to serve as a member of the board of COSON. Maikori was one of those behind the lobby for the NCC to officially appoint a CMO to collect royalties for songwriters and performers after 13 years of the NCC failing to settle the dispute between the MCSN and PMRS, both de-registered CMOs which had been embroiled in legal battles for supremacy for years. His appointment has been lauded as the right step in the right direction by music industry stakeholders.

Public speaker
Maikori is also a public speaker and has traveled widely to speak on entrepreneurship and youth development. He was a speaker at the M.I.T Legatum Annual conference Visions and Ventures in 2013. In 2014 he was invited to speak at the Oxford University African Business conference. In 2016, he was selected as a panelist and moderator at The Global Africa Investment Summit which was hosted by President Paul Kagame in Kigali, Rwanda. According to YNaija magazine, Audu is one of the most powerful people's list of 2014 in Nigerian Entertainment in March 2014. In October 2015, Audu was appointed the Chairman of the Nigerian Digital Music Monitoring Group, associated with organizations Nigerian Copyright Commission, Nigerian Communications Commission, National Information Technology Development Agency, National Assembly and other relevant bodies to develop specific methods for the implementation of the resolutions of the Summit.

Nigerian Idol
In September 2010, Maikori was made judge for the first season of Nigerian Idol alongside Yinka Davies and Jeffrey Daniel. The show proved to be a ratings success, but a year later he left the series to concentrate on other commitments, and was replaced by singer-publisher Charly Boy.

Achievements

Awards and accolades
 International Young Music Entrepreneur of the Year 2007 (Nigeria)
 International Young Music Entrepreneur of the Year 2007 (Global Winner)
 Entertainment Executive of the year 2011 by the Nigerian Entertainment Award (NEA)
 Award for outstanding award in Music and Entertainment by the National Youth Merit Awards 2011
 Young Entrepreneur of the Year (2011) – Diaspora Professionals Award 2011
 Mentor of the Year – 2010- Enterprise Foundation)
 Creative Entrepreneur of the Year for Music – 2011- CIAN
 Winner – African Awards for Entrepreneurship 2011 by  Legatum  &  Omidhyar Network
 Entertainment Executive of the Year – 2012- Nigerian Reunion Corporation
 SME Leader Award- 2014 by Fidelity Bank
 National Youth Merit Award in Entertainment – NYMA 2012
 Award for Excellence – Nigerian Law School  Class of 2013
 Award for Leadership in Governance – Junior Chambers International (JCI) -2013
 Enterprise Award for Entertainment - Southern Kaduna Peoples Union(SOKAPU) 2015
 City People Magazine Special Recognition for outstanding contribution to the Nigerian music industry (2011, 2015 and 2016)

In 2008, at the inaugural edition of the United Kingdom Young Music Entrepreneur, Maikori was nominated to serve as a judge alongside four other British music industry judges, making him the African judge in the history of the competition.

On 29 June 2007, he won the International Young Music Entrepreneur of the Year (IYMEY) for his work with Chocolate City beating off international competition from Egypt, India, Indonesia, Latvia, Lithuania, Malaysia, Philippines, Poland and Tanzania.

He received special judges commendation as well as $15,000 Dollars in prize money.

In December 2011, Chocolate City Group, under Audu's leadership, was named winner at the prestigious Africa Awards for Entrepreneurship in Nairobi, Kenya. Chocolate City was selected from over 3,300 applicants from 48 African countries to win prize of $50,000.

In November 2014, he was inducted as a Fellow of the Nigerian Leadership Institute(NLI) in November at the NLI-Yale Leadership Conference which held at the campus in New Haven.

Fellowships
Fellow – Nigerian Leadership Initiative  (NLI)
Life Fellow – Guild of Artistes and Poets (GAP)
Honorary Fellow – Institute of Chartered Portfolio Management Nigeria

Judge
Audu has served as judge on numerous entrepreneurship and innovation competitions both locally and internationally which include:- 
M.I.T Inclusive Innovation Competition - 2018 
Chivas The Venture Competition - 2015 and 2016
Etisalat Prize for Innovation- 2012,2013,2014 and 2015
Microsoft Passion to Empire Competition- 2015
SheLeads Africa -2014
British Council International Young Fashion Entrepreneur of the Year - 2009
British Council International Young Music Entrepreneur of the Year - 2008 & 2009
British Council United Kingdom Young Music Entrepreneur of the Year - 2008

References

External links
 
 Audu Maikori on British Council

Living people
Nigerian businesspeople
21st-century Nigerian lawyers
University of Jos alumni
1975 births